{{Infobox Boxingmatch
|fight date=March 17, 1990
|Fight Name=Thunder Meets Lightning
|location=Las Vegas Hilton, Winchester, Nevada, US
|image= 
|fighter1=Julio César Chávez
|nickname1=The Great Mexican Champion
|record1=68–0 (55 KO)
|height1=5 ft 7 in
|weight1=139+1/2 lb
|hometown1=Ciudad Obregón, Sonora, Mexico
|recognition1=WBC light welterweight champion[[The Ring (magazine)|The Ring]] No. 2 ranked pound-for-pound fighter3-division world champion
|fighter2=Meldrick Taylor
|nickname2=TNT
|record2=24–0–1 (14 KO)
|height2=5 ft 6+1/2 in
|weight2=139+3/4 lb
|hometown2=Philadelphia, Pennsylvania, US
|recognition2=IBF light welterweight championThe Ring No. 6 ranked pound-for-pound fighter
|titles=WBC and IBF light welterweight titles
|result=Chávez won via 12th–round TKO
}}

Julio César Chávez vs. Meldrick Taylor, also billed as Thunder Meets Lightning, was a light welterweight world championship bout held on March 17, 1990 between WBC world champion Julio César Chávez of Mexico and IBF world champion Meldrick Taylor of the United States, both at light welterweight, which was a historic event in professional boxing. It was titled "Thunder Meets Lightning" as an allusion to the punching power of Chávez and fast handspeed of Taylor. The fight was expected to be a rousing and exciting one but few, if any, could have foreseen the intense action it would produce, or the lasting fame it would earn in boxing history due to its dramatic and controversial ending that continues to be widely debated to this day. It would later be named The Ring'' magazine's Fight of the Year for 1990, and later the "Fight of the Decade" for the 1990s.

Build-up
From the mid 80s until early 1990 much of the attention given to boxing, particularly by the casual fan, was devoted to Mike Tyson. This served to overshadow a number of bouts and emerging stars in the lower weight classes. However, after Tyson lost to Buster Douglas in February 1990, it would give other bouts and fighters a new chance to shine. As Chávez-Taylor took place only a month later, it was one of the first bouts to benefit from this. The fact that both Chávez and Taylor were undefeated champions with vastly different personalities and fighting styles certainly did nothing to diminish the pre-fight hype, which was intense.

The fighters
Julio César Chávez was a legend in the making in his native Mexico. Already a three-time world champion in the Jr. Lightweight, Lightweight and Jr. Welterweight divisions, he brought an impressive undefeated record of 68–0 with 55 wins by knockout. That undefeated streak was the longest in nearly 80 years. In many ways Chávez was the epitome of the "Mexican" style of boxing: He patiently but relentlessly stalked and closed in on the other fighter, ignoring whatever punishment he took for the chance to dish out his own at close range, particularly in the form of a crunching body attack that would either wear down his opponents until they collapsed in pain and exhaustion, or became too tired to defend as Chávez shifted his attack to the head and went for a knockout.

Meldrick Taylor was nearly a polar opposite to the methodical Chávez. Taylor was gifted with astounding hand and foot speed and had won an Olympic gold medal at just 17 as a member of the 1984 boxing team, which featured future legends such as Evander Holyfield and Pernell Whitaker. Taylor's rise through the professional ranks was also quick, as his speed and reflexes proved to be nearly impossible for his foes to counter. His greatest weakness seemed not to be physical but in his attitude, because despite his relative lack of punching power, Taylor had proven to be more than willing to brawl with his opponents, giving them opportunities to hit him that they might not have had otherwise.

The fight
Taylor's brilliant hand and foot speed and boxing abilities gave him the early advantage, allowing him to begin building a large lead on points. He frequently hit Chávez with dazzling combinations and danced around the other man, making it difficult for Chávez, a skilled combination puncher who relied on an accumulation of damage to knock out his foes, to land more than one blow at a time. However rather than become discouraged Chávez remained relentless in his pursuit of Taylor and due to his greater punching power Chávez made sure that Taylor had to pay a terrible toll in order to win rounds. Coming into the later rounds, Taylor was bleeding from the mouth, his entire face was swollen, the bones around his eye socket had been broken, he had swallowed a considerable amount of his own blood, and as he grew tired, Taylor was increasingly forced into exchanging blows with Chávez, which only gave Chávez a greater chance to cause damage. While there was little doubt that Taylor had solidly won the first three quarters of the fight, the question at hand was whether he would survive the final quarter, especially after the end of the 11th round when Taylor was so dazed that he nearly went into Chávez' corner between rounds, until referee Richard Steele directed him back to his own.

Going into the final round, Taylor held a secure lead on the scorecards of two of the three judges, (Dave Moretti and Jerry Roth had the score 107-102 and 108-101 respectively for Taylor, while Chuck Giampa had Chávez ahead 105-104), and the sense for everyone watching was that Chávez would have to knock Taylor out to claim a victory, whereas Taylor merely needed to stay away from the Mexican legend. However, in a strange scene between rounds, Taylor's trainer Lou Duva told him that he needed to win the final round, and as a result Taylor did not stay away, but continued to trade blows with Chávez. As he did so, Taylor showed signs of extreme exhaustion, which included staggering around the ring, visibly wobbling as he moved and at one point he fell to the canvas after missing Chávez with a wild left. But regardless of that, every tick of the clock brought Taylor closer to victory unless Chávez could knock him out.

With about a minute left in the round, Chávez hit Taylor squarely with several hard punches, and Taylor responded by mockingly feigning weakness, but Chávez was not convinced by Taylor's bravado and stayed on the attack, continuing to hit Taylor with well-placed shots. Finally, with about 25 seconds to go, Chávez landed a hard right hand that caused Taylor to stagger forward towards a corner, forcing Chávez back ahead of him. Suddenly Chávez stepped around Taylor, positioning him so that Taylor was trapped in the corner, with no way to escape from Chávez' desperate final flurry. Chávez then nailed Taylor with a tremendous right hand that dropped the younger man. By using the ring ropes to pull himself up, Taylor managed to return to his feet and was given the mandatory 8-count. Referee Richard Steele then asked Taylor twice if he was able to continue fighting, at the same time touching Taylor's arms, probably in an attempt to get him to let go off the ropes and present the gloves as is customary in order to continue fighting, but Taylor failed to answer and still held on to the ropes. Steele then concluded that Taylor was unable to continue and signalled that he was ending the fight, resulting in a TKO victory for Chávez with only two seconds to go in the bout.

Aftermath
To this day, Steele's decision remains hotly debated, although the general consensus seems to steadily increase in favour of a vindication of Richard Steele's decision, and a growing acknowledgement that his career was unjustly affected by HBO's broadcast of his decision that day.

Many fans believe Taylor should have been allowed to continue because there were mere seconds remaining in the fight and he was ahead on the scorecards, or that he should have been allowed to continue because it appeared that he might have given a slight nod to Steele when asked "Are you okay?" Others agree with the decision, arguing that another good punch would have caused irreversible damage to Taylor, especially considering the tremendous damage Taylor had absorbed already and that he needed an extended stay in the hospital to recuperate. Additionally, Taylor continued holding on to the ropes throughout the referee's count to steady himself and could not give a coherent response to Steele. Still other fans comment on the fact that Steele clearly ignored a flashing red light in the corner that signalled that fewer than ten seconds remained in the fight. They believe that Steele went out of his way to end the fight and that it was he (Steele) and not Chavez who beat Taylor.

Because Chávez was promoted by Don King and Steele had made decisions that had been questioned in other King promoted fights, there was widespread speculation over whether King had somehow bribed Steele, particularly when it came to light that Taylor's trainer Lou Duva had specifically objected to the appointment of Steele and been overruled by the boxing authorities. Some also cited the apparent discrepancy between how Steele responded in this bout and his actions two years before this match in the bout between Thomas Hearns and Iran Barkley. In that bout Barkley first knocked Hearns down in the third round and a discombobulated Hearns appeared to be in no shape to continue but Steele let him go on, stating after the fight that a great champion like Hearns should be given the chance to pull himself together. In contrast with this, after the Chávez-Taylor fight, Steele told interviewer Larry Merchant that when he sees a hurt fighter he is stopping the fight, regardless of the time left. It can be noted that Steele made no obvious attempt to aid Chavez during the fight. One example being that although Steele issued a few warnings to Taylor for repeated low blows, at one point later in the fight, Jim Lampley, commentating for HBO, made reference to Taylor's landing 20 plus low blows on Chavez and Steele's handling of the situation. The inference of some is if Steele was to be helping Chavez, he was well within his authority to have done so by deducting points from Taylor.

Chávez' status as an emerging legend was cemented by the bout, and for the next several years he was widely considered the best fighter in the world. His unbeaten streak would stretch to 89–0–1 before he suffered his first loss, to Frankie Randall. Towards the end of his career Chávez began to cut easily, a tendency that cost him several fights. Like many fighters, he continued to fight even after time had diminished his skills, and would go in and out of retirement several times. He retired for good after a loss on September 17, 2005, in a bout where he claimed to have injured his hand. His final career record stands at 108–6–2. He holds several records, including for most title defenses and championship fights.

It is popularly believed that Meldrick Taylor was never the same physically or psychologically after the Chavez bout. Famed sportswriter William Nack said he had never seen a boxer give so much as Taylor did in the fight. Nack claimed that Taylor's "prime" was literally beaten out of him and was thus gone forever. Dr. Flip Homansky, who examined Taylor following the fight and immediately sent him to the hospital, summarized his injuries by saying "Meldrick suffered a facial fracture, he was urinating pure blood, his face was grotesquely swollen... this was a kid who was truly beaten up to the face, the body, and the brain". Taylor also showed signs of disorientation and short-term memory loss common to head injuries and concussions. His symptoms were apparent in the post fight interview with boxing commentator Larry Merchant, where Taylor insisted that Steele had ended the bout without giving him a count or asking if he was ok until he was shown a replay of events.

Although Taylor would continue fighting and succeed in winning another championship, the brilliance that he displayed both during and before the Chávez fight would prove elusive afterwards. A crushing fourth round knockout loss to Terry Norris in 1992 spelled the end to Taylor's career as a top-level fighter. He was also knocked out in a 1994 rematch with Chávez. Taylor continued to fight on and off for years, but never again in fights of any note. At the same time, rumors of brain damage circled around him, and eventually numerous boxing districts within the U.S. refused to grant him a license to fight. Perhaps most stunning was his appearance and speech during Legendary Nights, an HBO documentary series that profiled some of its most famous bouts. The episode dealing with Chávez-Taylor showed Taylor's speech to be extremely slurred and at times nearly incomprehensible, quite a change from the articulate young Taylor that many fans remembered. Taylor's final record stands at 38–8–1.

Meldrick Taylor still resides in his native Philadelphia. On May 15, 2009, Taylor released a book titled "Two Seconds From Glory" detailing the fight with Julio Cesar Chávez along with other controversial subjects.

Undercard
 Greg Page knocks out Martis Fleming at 1:36 of round 1.

References

Boxing matches
1990 in boxing
Boxing in Las Vegas
1990 in sports in Nevada
Boxing on HBO
March 1990 sports events in the United States
Westgate Las Vegas